Aayiram Poi is a 1969 Indian Tamil-language comedy film, directed by Muktha Srinivasan and written by Cho. It is based on Cho's novel Yaaro Ivar Yaaro. The film stars Jaishankar, Vanisri, Cho and Manorama. It was released on 11 July 1969.

Plot 

Chinna Durai (V. K. Ramasamy) dislikes his brother-in-law, Kanagasabi (V. S. Raghavan) and stands in the way of a marriage arrangement for his daughter Malathy (Vanisri) and Kanagasabi's son Ravi (Jaishankar). The film deals with how Ravi's resourcefulness helps him in getting Malathi's hand in marriage.

Cast 
 Jaishankar as Ravi, Kanagasabai's son
 Vanisri as Malathi, Chinnadurai's daughter
 Cho as Muthu, Ravi's friend
 Manorama as Lilly, Malathi's friend
 Shylashri as Latha, Ethiraj's henchmen
 V. S. Raghavan as Kanagasabai
 Tambaram Lalitha as Kalyani, Ravi's mother
 V. K. Ramasamy as Chinna Durai
 P. K. Saraswathy as Parvathi, Malathi's Mother/Kanagasabai's sister
 T. P. Muthulakshmi as Maragatham, Lilly's mother
 Thengai Srinivasan as Thanikachalam, Muthu's father
 M. R. R. Vasu as Ethiraj, gang leader
 V. Gopalakrishnan as Singaram, Lilly's Car driver/Ethiraj's henchman
Senthamarai as Raja, Ethiraj's henchman
 Neelu as Neelakanda Sasthri, cameo appearance
Pakoda Kadhar as Ward boy

Production 
Aayiram Poi is the feature film debut of Neelu, previously a theatre actor. The film's title references the Tamil proverb, "Aayiram Poiyai Solliyaavadhu Oru Kalyanathai Pannu" (At least tell a thousand lies to make a marriage work). It is based on Yaaro Ivar Yaaro, a novel written by Cho and serialised in the magazine Kalki.

Soundtrack 
Music was by V. Kumar and lyrics were written by Kannadasan.

Release and reception 
Aayiram Poi was released on 11 July 1969. The Indian Express wrote, "The picture suffers from uneven stress. And it is too long to sustain the humour or the suspense" but praised the absence of vulgarity.

References

External links 
 

1960s Tamil-language films
1969 comedy films
1969 films
Films based on Indian novels
Films scored by V. Kumar
Indian black-and-white films
Indian comedy films